HD 23277 (HR 1138) is a spectroscopic binary located in the northern circumpolar constellation Camelopardalis. With a combined apparent magnitude of 5.39, it is faintly visible to the naked eye under ideal conditions.

The primary has a classification of kA2hA6VmA7, which indicates that it has the calcium K-line of an A2 star, but its hydrogen lines suggest a class of A6 V and metallic lines of an A7 star. At present it has 2.38 times the Sun's mass, and 3.55 times its radius. The companion has 2.11 times the Sun's mass, which suggests it is an A-type main-sequence star like the primary. Both stars spin at a projected rotational velocity of 25 km/s, common for an Am star.

Reference

Am stars
Spectroscopic binaries
A-type main-sequence stars
Durchmusterung objects
023277
017854
1138
Camelopardalis (constellation)